Events in the year 1944 in Portugal.

Incumbents
President: Óscar Carmona
Prime Minister: António de Oliveira Salazar

Events

Arts and entertainment

Sports
AC Vila Meã founded
Almada A.C. founded

Births
29 March – Eduardo Prado Coelho,  journalist, columnist and university professor (d. 2007)
4 July – Joe Berardo, businessman, stock investor and art collector.
23 July – Maria João Pires, pianist

Deaths

29 April – Bernardino Machado, nobleman and politician (born 1851)

References

 
1940s in Portugal
Portugal
Years of the 20th century in Portugal
Portugal